The Open Data-Link Interface (ODI), developed by Apple and Novell, serves the same function as Microsoft and 3COM's Network Driver Interface Specification (NDIS). Originally, ODI was written for NetWare and Macintosh environments. Like NDIS, ODI provides rules that establish a vendor-neutral interface between the protocol stack and the adapter driver. It resides in Layer 2, the Data Link layer, of the OSI model.  This interface also enables one or more network drivers to support one or more protocol stacks.

See also

 Network Driver Interface Specification (NDIS)
 Uniform Driver Interface (UDI)
 Universal Network Device Interface (UNDI)
 PC/TCP Packet Driver
 Virtual Loadable Module (VLM)
 NetWare I/O Subsystem (NIOS)
 Personal NetWare (PNW)
 DR-WebSpyder

Computer networks